St Paul's Cathedral School is an independent school associated with St Paul's Cathedral in London and is located in New Change in the City of London.

The school has around 220 pupils, most of whom are day pupils, both boys and girls, including up to 40 boy choristers who are all boarders and who sing the daily services in St Paul's Cathedral. The school became co-educational in 2002.

History
Originally the school was set up to provide education solely for the choristers and dates from about 1123, when eight needy children were given a home and education in return for singing in the cathedral. The Choir School and a Grammar School co-existed under the aegis of the cathedral for many years, until the Grammar School was moved and re-established in 1511 by the humanist Dean John Colet to become St Paul's School. The Cathedral School and St Paul's School (now a public school) are now distinct and separate institutions.

The original Choir School, which stood in St Paul's Churchyard, was destroyed with the cathedral in the Great Fire of London in 1666. The school has had several incarnations being re-built in 1670, in 1822 (in Cheapside) and 1875 (in Carter Lane). The building of 1875 is now a Youth Hostel. The current buildings date from the 1960s.

Activities
In addition to the daily Evensong, the choristers of St. Paul's Cathedral, have taken part in a number of important recordings and tours and have performed at a number of important state occasions, including Winston Churchill's funeral and the wedding of Prince Charles and Diana, Princess of Wales.

Child-abuse controversy
In December 2007 Stephen Douglas-Hogg, a former Classics and house master of the school, was arrested and charged with the abuse of a number of choristers during the 1980s. Following his attempted suicide during the initial stages of proceedings in October 2008, the 50-year-old Douglas-Hogg changed his plea halfway through the trial and admitted to 13 counts of indecent assault on five boys aged under 14. On 11 May 2009 Douglas-Hogg was sentenced to four and a half years' imprisonment at Southwark Crown Court.

Former pupils

Notable former pupils include:
 Jonathan Battishill, composer
 Simon Russell Beale, actor
 William Boyce, composer
 Alastair Cook, cricketer
 Charles Dixon, politician
 William Cummings, musician and organist
 Jimmy Edwards, script writer and actor
 Richard Gibson, actor
 Maurice Greene, composer
 Charles Groves, orchestral conductor
 Robin Holloway, composer
 Neil Howlett, opera singer
 James Lancelot, organist
 Walter de la Mare, poet and novelist
 Stephen Oliver, composer
 Julian Ovenden, actor and singer
 Peter Philips, composer and organist
 Percy Sillitoe, policeman, Director General of MI5 1946-1953
 Jonathan Sorrell, composer
 John Stainer, composer and organist
 Anthony Way, chorister and classical singer
 Marius de Vries, composer and music producer

References

External links
Official site

1123 establishments in England
Cathedral schools
Choir schools in England
Church of England private schools in the Diocese of London
Private co-educational schools in London
Private schools in the City of London
 
Preparatory schools in London
School